Rathin Ghosh is currently the Food and Supplies Minister of West Bengal in the third Mamata Banerjee Government.
He is an Indian politician belonging to the All India Trinamool Congress. He was elected as a member of West Bengal Legislative Assembly from Madhyamgram in 2011, 2016, and 2021.

In 1998, he joined the Trinamool congress and won the Madhyamgram Municipality election by defeating Left Front (Ruling party of state at that time) and went on to become the first TMC Chairman of North 24 Parganas. Under his leadership, TMC got the first Municipal Board in North 24 Parganas. 

Earlier, Ghosh was a congressman who went on to become the Chairman of the Madhyamgram Municipality in 1999. Ghosh was a corporator in the 2004 municipal board. This was after the elections were  rigged by left front leader, Subhash Chakraborty.

Ghosh is also known for his huge development works all over the Madhyamgram. He has been chairman of the municipality for three times and four times the Corporator, as well as being the MLA of West Bengal Assembly for three times.
He is also a full-time social worker who undertakes the study responsibility for hundreds of poor children.

In 2021, after the West Bengal Legislative Elections, CM Mamata Banerjee made him the Cabinet Minister of Government of West Bengal.
Ghosh is currently Food and Supplies Minister of West Bengal in third Mamata Banerjee Government.

,References

Living people
Trinamool Congress politicians from West Bengal
West Bengal MLAs 2011–2016
West Bengal MLAs 2016–2021
Year of birth missing (living people)